Napapijri is an Italian premium clothing brand owned by VF Corporation. Originally a producer of alpine travel bags, Napapijri now markets apparel, as well as fashion accessories, footwear and bags. The Napapijri brand is most widely associated with its Rainforest jacket.

As of April 2022 there are 229 Napapijri stores in 23 countries, primarily in Europe.

History
Napapijri was found in 1987 by Giuliana Rosset, whose family owns Saint-Roch the oldest distillery in the Aosta Valley region. She purchased Green Sport Monte Bianco S.p.A., a small backpack company, from a Turin artisans. The headquarters was moved to Quart, initially starting to produce backpacks and travel bags with about fifteen employees. The Bering Bag, a waxed canvas duffel bag marketed to travelers was the first product to carry the Napapijri name.
 
In 1990, the company expanded into the field of sportswear in which bright colors were dropped and started designing and producing clothing and accessories. It introduced its signature Skidoo jacket, a lightweight, rain-proof, anorak designed for extreme temperatures.
 
The company continued to add to its product range in the 2000s. In 2002, the Napapijri Kids clothing line was introduced, followed by Napapijri footwear in 2007. The first Napapijri store opened in Chamonix, France in 1997. Since then, the company has consistently added stores and opened its 100th in Stockholm in 2012. That year, the first Asian Napapijri store opened in Seoul, South Korea.

Napapijri was acquired by the U.S.-based clothing manufacturer VF Corporation in 2004.   
 
Andrea Cannelloni joined Napapijri in 2009 as vice president and general manager and is now brand president.  Cannelloni had worked as a designer at Ermenegildo Zegna and Trussardi, and served as Creative Director for Boss Orange and Boss Green at Hugo Boss.

The Italian company has a long-standing dispute with Geographical Norway, a Spanish clothing brand of the French company Artextyl, over the trademark design that includes the Norwegian flag on products.

Brand
Napapijri incorporates imagery into its branding to accentuate the themes of travel, adventure and environmental consciousness. The name itself is a variation of the Finnish word "napapiiri", which means Arctic Circle. Its logo is the company's name rendered in half-positive and half-negative block letters to suggest the North Pole and South Pole in graphic form, similar to flag of Greenland. The flag of Norway is also employed to evoke that country's extreme conditions, dramatic landscapes, and tradition of famous explorers.

Products
Napapijri designs and produces casual apparel and sportswear for men, women, and children, including outerwear and footwear. The company also produces duffel bags, backpacks, cross-body bags and shoulder bags, as well as accessories including belts, hats, scarves, gloves and socks in Vietnam.

Stores
As of April 2022 there are 229 stores in Europe (primarily in Italy, Spain and France) and also in Kazahstan, Puerto Rico, Qatar and UAE. The company directly operates 12 of the stores, with the remainder operated by franchisees.

Collaborations
In 2002, Napapijri teamed with Karl Lagerfeld for a special edition of the company's signature Skidoo jacket.

Japanese designer Yoshinori Ono designed a special clothing line for Napapijri in 2010 which was designated as the ‘66° 33’ Special Project’.  The numbers referred to the latitude of the Arctic Circle.

Napapijri has supported travel, research and exploration to raise its public profile. In 2008, to celebrate the opening of a store in Milan, Napapijri teamed with photographer/adventurer Sebastian Copeland to present an exhibition of Copeland's photographs entitled “Antarctica: The Global Warming” at the store.  Proceeds from the sale of the photographs went to Global Green USA, the U.S. arm of Green Cross International. Napapijri continues to sponsor Copeland on expeditions to photograph and film endangered environments.   
  

  
In 2011, Napapijri designed a jacket costing 10 Euros for the Democratic Wear campaign launched by the Coin department store chain in Italy. A percentage of the sales went to Green Cross Italy.

References

VF Corporation
Clothing companies established in 1987
Clothing brands of Italy
Italian companies established in 1987
Italian brands
Clothing companies of Italy
High fashion brands
Manufacturing_companies_of_Italy
Shoe companies of Italy
Sporting goods manufacturers of Italy
Sportswear brands
2004 mergers and acquisitions